Khush Dil Khan is a Pakistani politician who was the member of the Provincial Assembly of Khyber Pakhtunkhwa from March 2008 to March 2013 and from August 2018 to January 2023. He is the provincial Senior Vice President of the Awami National Party. He has also been the Deputy Speaker of the Provincial Assembly of Khyber Pakhtunkhwa from March 2008 to March 2013.

References

Living people
Awami National Party MPAs (Khyber Pakhtunkhwa)
Politicians from Khyber Pakhtunkhwa
Year of birth missing (living people)